What A Life! is a work of satirical fiction by Edward Verrall Lucas and George Morrow published in 1911. The book is best known for its inventive narrative technique: the story takes the reader through the life of an upper-class British gentleman, with the plot being dictated by the book's illustrations, which the authors took from a copy of Whiteley's General Catalogue (Whiteley's was a London department store at the time). It was included in the 1936 MOMA exhibition "Fantastic Art, Dada, and Surrealism".

Though the book is still copyrighted in the United Kingdom, it is in the public domain in the US.

Release details
1911, UK, Methuen & Co. (ISBN NA), Pub date August 17, 1911, hardback (First edition)
1975, US, Dover Publications, Pub date ? ? 1975, paperback
1987, US, Dover Publications, Pub date May 20, 1987, paperback (reissue)
1987, UK, William Collins Sons & Co., Pub date October 19, 1987, hardback
2015, FR, Quelle vie!, Editions Prairial, July 1, 2015, paperback
2018, US, Black Scat Books, Pub date May 16, 2018, paperback

References

External links 
 What A Life! Online text with original illustrations. Public domain in the US.

1911 British novels
British autobiographical novels
British satirical novels
Methuen Publishing books